Brodkin is a surname. Notable people with the surname include:

Herbert Brodkin (1912–1990), American producer and director of film and television
Simon Brodkin (born 1977), English comedian